Armenian needlelace (also known as Bebilla, Nazareth Lace and Knotted Lace) is a pure form of needle lace made using only a needle, thread and pair of scissors.

History
Like lacis, or filet lace, Armenian needlelace seems to be an obvious descendant of net making. Where lacis adds decorative stitches to a net ground, Armenian needlelace involves making the net itself decorative.

There is some archeological evidence suggesting the use of lace in prehistoric Armenia and the prevalence of pre-Christian symbology in traditional designs would certainly suggest a pre-Christian root for this art form.

In contrast to Europe where lace was the preserve of the nobility, in Armenia it decorated everything from traditional headscarves to lingerie and lacemaking was part of many or most women's lives.

Technique
The lace is made by tying knots, usually tied onto the previous round of the piece creating small loops of thread onto which the next round of knots can be tied. Patterns are created by varying the length of the loops, missing loops from the previous round, adding extra loops and similar.

When used as an edging the lace can be made directly onto the hem of the fabric being edged. When a doily or freeform object (such as the birds and flowers decorating traditional headscarves) is being started a series of loops is tied onto a slip knot which is pulled tight to complete the first round.

See also
List of fabric names

References

Specific

Needle lace
Armenian art
Armenian culture
Textile arts of Armenia